USS LST-347 was a  in the United States Navy during World War II. She was later sold to France as Vire (L9003).

Construction and career 
LST-347 was laid down on 10 November 1942 at Norfolk Navy Yard, Portsmouth, Virginia. Launched on 7 February 1943 and commissioned on 7 February 1943.

Service in the United States 
During World War II, LST-347 was assigned to the Europe-Africa-Middle East theater. She took part in the Invasion of Sicilian from 9 to 15 July 1943 and the Salerno landings from 9 to 21 September 1943.

She participated in the Invasion of Normandy from 6 to 25 June 1944.

LST-347 was decommissioned on 19 December 1944 and transferred to the Royal Navy.

She was struck from the Navy Register on 28 April 1949.

Service in the United Kingdom 
HMS LST-347 was commissioned on 18 December 1944 and was part of W Task Force which participated in the recapture of Rangoon, before proceeding to the eventual invasion of Malaya at Morib and Port Swettenham, and to Singapore and Bangkok doing relief work repatriating ex P.O.W.s of the Japanese.

She was paid off at Singapore on 23 January 1946 and leased to France on 23 January 1948.

Service in France 
She was transferred to the French Navy and commissioned on 23 January 1948 with the same name LST-347.

In 1950, she was given the name Vire (LST-347).

Liamone took part in the First Indochina War between 19 December 1946 to 1 August 1954.

She was later redesignated as L9003 in the later years of her service in the 1950s.

The ship was out of service and sold for scrap in early 1957.

Awards 
LST-347 have earned the following awards:

American Campaign Medal
Europe-Africa-Middle East Campaign Medal (3 battle stars)
World War II Victory Medal

Citations

Sources 
 
 
 
 

 

World War II amphibious warfare vessels of the United States
World War II amphibious warfare vessels of the United Kingdom
Ships built in Portsmouth, Virginia
1943 ships
LST-1-class tank landing ships of the United States Navy
LST-1-class tank landing ships of the Royal Navy
Ships transferred from the United States Navy to the French Navy